Uroproctus is a monotypic genus of Thelyphonid whip scorpions, first described by Reginald Innes Pocock in 1894. Its single species, Uroproctus assamensis is distributed in Bangladesh, Bhutan, Cambodia, India and Nepal.

References 

Arachnid genera
Monotypic arachnid genera
Uropygi